The Sixth Central Pay Commission was convened by the Union Cabinet of India on 5 October 2006.  The Pay Commission was headed by B. N. Srikrishna. The other members of the Commission were Ravindra Dholakia, J. S. Mathur, and Member-Secretary Sushama Nath.

The Sixth Central Pay Commission submitted its report to the Finance Minister, P. Chidambaram on 24 March 2008.  On 29 August 2008, the government announced its decision to implement the report on "structure of emoluments, allowances, conditions of service and retirement benefits of Central Government employees including ... the Defence Forces",  "subject to some modifications". 

The Sixth Central Pay Commission, unlike the earlier Central Pay Commissions, was given a wide remit. It included making  recommendations to rationalize the governmental organization and structure to make them more "modern, professional and citizen friendly entities that are dedicated to the service of the people".

Report
On 14 August 2008, the United Progressive Alliance (UPA) government, headed by Manmohan Singh, approved the Sixth Central Pay Commission recommendations with some modifications. Back pay was given from 1 January 2006  and allowances with effect from 1 September 2008. The report led to a six percent increase in the cost of living allowance for central government employees from 16 percent to 22 percent.

The Sixth Central Pay Commission estimated that the financial implication of its recommendations would be "Rs.7975 crore for the year 2008  2009, and an additional, one time burden of Rs.18060 crore on payment of arrears".

Ranks
The Sixth Central Pay Commission created twenty distinct ranks (pay grades) in the Government hierarchy. It was intended that an employee's status and seniority of post would be determined. The pay grades were intended to make "pay scales ... irrelevant for purposes of computing seniority".   The highest ranks such as the Secretary, and the Cabinet Secretary (or equivalent), were placed on an "Apex Scale" outside the grades with a fixed scale of pay. 

The Sixth Central Pay Commission recommended four running pay bands (excluding -1S). They would contain twenty grades.  The commission explained that the pay band would ease stagnation by opening "promotional avenues ... even though no functional justification for higher posts may exist"; ease problems of "pay fixation"; and remove "many of the pay scale related anomalies".

Another recommendation was the creation of an "additional separate running pay band ... the scale of Rs.18400  22400 in higher administrative grades".

Anomalies 
The Sixth Central Pay Commission report contained anomalies which were examined by an "Anomalies Committee". The committee looked at "individual, post-specific and cadre-specific anomalies". Anomalies concerning the Armed Forces members were not addressed and the "One Rank One Pension" (OROP) was not implemented leading to public anger with the commission and the government.

In November 2015, Satbir Singh, chairman of the Indian Ex Servicemen Movement (IESM), said there were forty anomalies yet to be addressed.

Running pay bands and the armed forces
The Sixth Central Pay Commission recommended four selection grade military ranks be linked. Lieutenant Colonel would be linked to Major General as would their equivalents in the navy and air force. This would be similar to civilian ranks based on time served between four and sixteen years. Major generals, rear admirals, and air marshals (a highly selective rank) were made at par with civilian employees with sixteen years of service. The government accepted this recommendation.

Some members of the armed forces and veterans disagreed with the change.

Time scale civil police promotions 
Following the Sixth Central Pay Commission, the UPA Government made promotions in the Indian Police Service and other civil services dependent on time served. In 2007, Indian Police Service officers were promoted on a fixed time table, independent of functional requirements or span of responsibility, up to the level of Inspector General. Promotions were mandated on completion of 4, 9, 13, 14, and 18 years of service.  Most Inspector General functions and responsibilities were no different from that of earlier era Deputy Inspector Generals and Superintendents of Police.

Up graduation of heads of Central and State Police Forces
Following the Sixth Central Pay Commission report, the UPA Government, in recognition of the growing role and influence of the Ministry of Home (MHA), India's Interior Ministry, promoted the heads of the five police led Central Para Military Forces to the highest pay grade, or the Apex Scale, with a fixed pay of Rs. 80,000. The promotions to the Apex Scale included not only the heads of the bigger forces like the Central Reserve Police Force (CRPF), and Border Security Force (BSF), but also the smaller MHA Forces, like the Indo-Tibetan Border Police (ITBP), Central Industrial Security Force (CISF) (CISF) and Sashastra Seema Bal (SSB).  In addition to these promotions, the government also promoted the Director General of the Railway Police, and the Director General of Police of States to the Apex Scale. This made the Director Generals of these central and state forces at par in rank, pay, and status with Secretaries to the Government of India, Armed Forces senior most Lieutenant Generals, Air Marshals, and Vice Admirals.

Non functional promotions
After the Sixth Central Pay Commission, the government implemented "Non Functional" ranks. Avay Shukla, who retired in 2010, said, "Whenever any Indian Administrative Service officer ... in pay band 3 or pay band 4, is promoted, members of the Indian Police service and other All India Services (AIS), senior to such officers will be automatically be eligible to be appointed to the same grade on non-functional basis from the date of posting of the Indian Administrative Service officer in that particular grade".

See also
Pay Commission
One Rank, One Pension
Defence pensions, India
7th Central Pay Commission (CPC) and Defence Forces

References

External links
 Report of the Sixth Central Pay Commission Ministry of Finance

Government finances in India
Indian commissions and inquiries
2006 establishments in India
Ministry of Finance (India)